Kan Paik Ti (also Kanpaikti) is a town in Waingmaw Township, Myitkyina District, Kachin State of Myanmar. The town is home to one of 5 official border trade posts with China, and opened on 23 August 1998.

References 

Populated places in Kachin State
China–Myanmar border crossings